The Sunshine Boys is a 1996 American comedy television film directed by John Erman and based on the 1972 play of the same title by Neil Simon about two legendary (and cranky) comics brought together for a reunion and revival of their famous act. The film stars Woody Allen and Peter Falk as the comedy duo alongside Sarah Jessica Parker. It premiered on December 28, 1997, on Hallmark Hall of Fame on CBS.

Plot
Al Lewis and Willy Clark are two old comedians who were once a popular comedy act known as "Lewis and Clark" and also called the Sunshine Boys. After 43 years together, they parted ways 11 years ago on unfriendly terms and have not spoken to each other since then. A reunion is planned for a major network special on the history of comedy.

Cast
 Peter Falk as Willy Clark
 Woody Allen as Al Lewis
 Sarah Jessica Parker as Nancy Davison
 Liev Schreiber as Ricky Gregg
 Michael McKean as Scott Grogan
 Whoopi Goldberg as Nurse
 Edie Falco as Carol

Production
In 1995, Simon adapted his play for a Hallmark Entertainment production. His teleplay updated the setting and made the two comedians the product of the early days of television, the medium in which the playwright got his start. Unlike the film adaptation, although they are portrayed as cantankerous, their animosity was not as severe as Matthau's and Burns' characters' bad relationship.

Woody Allen was originally asked to direct the 1975 film adaptation The Sunshine Boys, but he was more interested in playing the role of Lewis and declined the offer. 20 years later he was cast as Lewis in this television adaptation.

References

External links
 

1996 television films
1996 comedy films
1996 films
American films based on plays
CBS network films
American comedy television films
Films about actors
Films about comedians
Films about old age
Films based on works by Neil Simon
Films directed by John Erman
Films set in New York City
Films shot in New York City
Films with screenplays by Neil Simon
Hallmark Hall of Fame episodes
1990s English-language films
1990s American films